Tornant Moat is an Irish National Monument composed of a ringfort and nearby barrows.

Location

History

Tornant Moat consists of a ringfort and barrows. The name derives from the Irish tor neannta, "nettle mound."

Description

Tornant Moat is a large circular ringfort (diameter m) with bank and moat and raised centre.

References

Archaeological sites in County Wicklow
National Monuments in County Wicklow